Sunriver (foaled March 17, 2003 in Kentucky, died 2009) is an American Thoroughbred race horse who was a contender for the Triple Crown in 2006.

Connections

Sunriver is owned by Aaron and Marie Jones and trained by Todd Pletcher. Sunriver was bred in Kentucky by Jerry & Liz Squyres.

Breeding
Sired by Saint Ballado, his dam is Goulash by Mari's Book, which makes him a full brother to the 2004 Eclipse Award American Champion Three-Year-Old Filly, Ashado.

Races

Sunriver died of a suspected heart attack in August 2009

References
 Sunriver's pedigree

2003 racehorse births
2009 racehorse deaths
Racehorses bred in Kentucky
Racehorses trained in the United States
Thoroughbred family 16-g